Trichilia reticulata is a species of plant in the family Meliaceae. It is endemic to Jamaica.

References

reticulata
Near threatened plants
Endemic flora of Jamaica
Taxonomy articles created by Polbot
Taxa named by Percy Wilson